Vladan Radača (born 15 July 1955) is a Serbian football coach and former player.

A goalkeeper, Radača was capped five times by Yugoslavia in 1987 and 1988.

Club career
Between 1982 and 1988, Radača spent six seasons at Rad, helping them win promotion to the Yugoslav First League in 1987.

In 1989, Radača moved abroad to Turkey and played for Samsunspor over the next four seasons, making 105 league appearances.

International career
At the age of 32, Radača became the oldest player to make a debut for Yugoslavia, coming on as a half-time substitute for Mauro Ravnić and keeping a clean sheet in a 4–1 loss to England on 11 November 1987. His fifth and final cap came on 4 June 1988 in a 1–1 friendly draw against West Germany.

Post-playing career
After hanging up his boots, Radača worked as a goalkeeping coach for numerous clubs, including Rad, Sartid Smederevo, Red Star Belgrade, and Spartak Subotica.

In January 2021, following Zoran Filipović's appointment as Libya manager, Radača was hired as the team's goalkeeping coach.

References

External links
 
 
 

1955 births
Living people
People from Svilajnac
Yugoslav footballers
Serbia and Montenegro footballers
Serbian footballers
Association football goalkeepers
Yugoslavia international footballers
FK Bor players
FK Trepča players
FK Majdanpek players
FK Rad players
FK Željezničar Sarajevo players
Samsunspor footballers
Yugoslav Second League players
Yugoslav First League players
Süper Lig players
Yugoslav expatriate footballers
Expatriate footballers in Turkey
Yugoslav expatriate sportspeople in Turkey
Association football goalkeeping coaches
Red Star Belgrade non-playing staff
Serbia and Montenegro expatriate sportspeople in Greece
Serbian expatriate sportspeople in Cyprus